Bandy the Rodeo Clown is the third album by country singer Moe Bandy, released in 1975 on the GRC label.

Track listing
"Bandy the Rodeo Clown" (Sanger D. Shafer, Lefty Frizzell) - 2:49
"Somewhere There's a Woman" (Rex Gosdin, Les Reed) - 2:56
"Give Me Liberty (Or Give Me All Your Love)" (Dallas Frazier) - 2:40
"Nobody's Waiting For Me" (Sanger D. Shafer, Warren Robb) - 2:31
"I Stop And Get Up (To Go Out Of My Mind)" (Paul Huffman, Joan'e Keller) - 1:59
"Oh, Lonesome Me" (Don Gibson) - 2:37
"I Sure Don't Need That Memory Tonight" (Eddy Raven) - 2:03
"Fais Do-Do" (Eddy Raven) - 2:09
"Goodbye On Your Mind" (Eddy Raven) - 1:53
"Signs Of A Woman Gone" (Rex Gosdin, Les Reed) - 2:21

Musicians
Charlie McCoy
Bobby Thompson
Bob Moore
Hargus "Pig" Robbins
Leo Jackson
Jimmy Capps
Johnny Gimble
Kenny Malone
Weldon Myrick
Dave Kirby

Backing vocals

The Jordanaires with Laverna Moore

Production
Sound engineers- Lou Bradley
Photography - Barry McClintock
Album design - Ruby Mazur

References

1975 albums
Moe Bandy albums
Albums produced by Ray Baker (music producer)